Hlaingthaya Township (also spelt Hlaing Tharyar and Hlinethaya) is located in the western part of Yangon, Myanmar. One of the biggest and most populous townships in the country with 15% of Yangon's urban population living there, Hlaingthaya also has a major industrial and factory presence. While Hlaingthaya is a largely working class suburb, developers have also built luxury housing developments in the southeastern part of the township.

The township comprises 20 wards and nine village tracts and shares borders with Htantabin Township in the north and west, Insein Township, Mayangon Township, and Hlaing Township in the east across the Yangon River, and Twante Township in the south.

History
Hlaingthaya was incorporated as a township in 1989, following the 8888 Uprising, in order to resettle squatters in central Yangon. In 1991, authorities began establishing industrial zones and produce trading centres in the township. The largest industrial zone, Hlaingthaya, was established in 1995 and covers a land area of 567 hectares. In 1995, FMI City, a gated housing development, was established in the township. After the 2008 Cyclone Nargis, thousands of internally displaced refugees from the Ayeyarwady delta migrants re-settled in Hlaingthaya.

In 2019, plans to split the township into two (due to violence and over-population) were reported, although no official announcement could be found, the township had already been split in West and East constituencies for the 2020 Myanmar general election.

In the aftermath of the 2021 Myanmar coup d'état, Hlaingthaya became a centre of anti-coup resistance. On 14 March 2021, the military and police forces committed the Hlaingthaya massacre, killing at least 65 civilians and marking a major escalation in the military's use of force against civilians.

Commerce 
Hlaingthaya is home to a dozen industrial zones, including Hlaingthaya, Shwe Linban, and Shwe Thanlwin, which housed more than 850 factories that employed 300,000 workers as of November 2019.

Infrastructure 
The township is connected to other parts of Yangon across the Yangon River over the Aung Zeya Bridge and the Bayinnaung Bridge, and to TwanteTownship over the Pan Hlaing river by the Pan Hlaing Bridge.

Demographics 
The 2014 Myanmar Census enumerated 687,867 persons in Hlaingthaya Township. The population density was 10,210.6 persons per square kilometre. 53.1% of residents were female, while 56.9% were male, and the median age was 25.6 years.

Education
The township has 46 primary schools, 8 middle schools and 4 high schools. West Yangon Technological University also maintains a campus in Hlaingthaya.

References

External links
"Profile Hlaingtharyar Township" April 2009, Myanmar Information Management Unit (MIMU) 

Townships of Yangon